"When It's Time" is a song by the American rock band Green Day from American Idiot: The Original Broadway Cast Recording, a cast recording to the musical production American Idiot, a stage adaptation of the band's 2004 concept album. The song was released as a single in the United Kingdom, where it reached no. 68 on the UK Singles Chart.

Background and release
Despite originally being written in 1992, around the time that Kerplunk was released by Lookout! Records, the song was not recorded until the band began work on their seventh studio album, American Idiot, released in 2004. Since it did not make the cut for that album, the song was not released until April 13, 2010 when it appeared on American Idiot: The Original Broadway Cast Recording. It was released as a single in the United Kingdom on June 11, 2010 through the band's label Reprise Records.

The single is available in the UK iTunes store along with Amazon's digital download service.

The song was performed at 924 Gilman Street in November 18, 1992 and made rare appearances in some shows of the 21st Century Breakdown World Tour, performed solo by Billie Joe Armstrong on an acoustic guitar. 

The song also appeared in most setlists during the European tour of 2010. It is also the third single from Green Day that was not accompanied by a music video, such as the cases of "She" and "J.A.R. (Jason Andrew Relva)".

Due to the sensitive nature of the lyrics, the director of the American Idiot musical, Michael Mayer, had to receive special permission from the band to offer an acoustic solo version sung by John Gallagher Jr. as a number for the production.

A demo of the song was included on the 25th anniversary release of the band's fifth studio album Nimrod.

Chart performance
The song began its chart performance on the UK Singles Chart on June 20, 2010. It entered at no. 71 and peaked at no. 68 the next week where it stayed for one week, the highest position it achieved.

References

2004 songs
2010 singles
Green Day songs
Songs written by Billie Joe Armstrong
Rock ballads
Reprise Records singles
Songs written by Tré Cool
Songs written by Mike Dirnt
2000s ballads